Romone McCrae (born 25 August 1991 in England) is a footballer who last played for Conference South team Sutton United.

Career
He made his professional debut on 5 April 2010 in a 2–2 draw against Barnsley for Peterborough United. After joining Conference National side Histon on a season long loan in August 2010, he scored on his full league debut against Barrow on the opening day of the 2010–11 season. McCrae went on to make a further 17 appearances in the league.

McCrae was released by Peterborough in the summer of 2011, and was signed by London-based Sutton United. Manager Paul Doswell said "He's a young lad who is not the finished product, but has promise and potential and the sort of player I like getting my teeth into to develop." McCrae scored his first goal for Sutton in his second appearance for the club, in a friendly against Kingstonian.

References

External links 
 Romone McCrae profile at theposh.com
 
 Romone McCrae profile at histonfc.co.uk

1991 births
Living people
English footballers
Crawley Town F.C. players
Peterborough United F.C. players
English Football League players
National League (English football) players
Sutton United F.C. players
Association football midfielders